Christopher T. Baker (born November 18, 1979) is a former American football tight end. He was drafted by the New York Jets in the third round of the 2002 NFL Draft. He played college football at Michigan State.

College career
He played college football at Michigan State from 1998-2001.  He finished with 133 catches for 1,705 yards and 13 touchdowns including a career best season as a Senior with 40 catches for 548 yards and four touchdowns.

College statistics

Professional career

New York Jets
Baker was drafted by the New York Jets in the third round (88th overall) of the 2002 NFL Draft. During the 2005 season, he served as the starting tight end until becoming injured and placed on the injured reserve list. Baker had a breakout season in 2006, setting career bests in receiving yards, receptions, touchdowns and starts, as the Jets finished 10-6 earning the fifth wild card spot. After a career year in 2007, Chris said the Jets promised him a new contract and lied.

Baker felt disrespected with the Jets decision to use their first-round pick in the 2008 NFL Draft on Dustin Keller and their acquisition of free agent Bubba Franks, which pushed Baker to third on the depth chart and made him the least-paid Jets tight end, despite his productive past two seasons. The Jets finally extended Baker with a three-year, $12.2 million contract extension through 2012, but it came with an out-clause stating the Jets would owe him nothing if he was cut from the team before March 5, 2009.

On February 20, 2009, Baker was released by the Jets.

New England Patriots
On February 27, 2009, Baker signed a five-year contract with the New England Patriots. On September 27, 2009, Baker caught Tom Brady's 200th career touchdown pass in the fourth quarter of the Patriots and Falcons game.

On March 4, 2010, Baker was released by the Patriots. Baker played in all 16 regular games for the 2009 season.

Seattle Seahawks
On March 13, 2010, Baker signed a contract with the Seattle Seahawks, primarily to serve as a blocking tight end. On January 4, 2011, Baker was placed on a season-ending injured reserve due to a fractured bone in his hip, four days before Seattle's playoff game against the New Orleans Saints. He caught nine passes for 116 yards and a touchdown through the season.

On February 24, 2011, Baker was released by the Seahawks. Baker played in all 16 regular games for 2010 season.

Personal life
In May 2009 Chris married his girlfriend, Yadira Taveras, in Long Island, New York. Together, they have a son, Chris Jr, and daughter Tamia. They reside near Boca Raton, Florida.

References

External links
Official website
Michigan State Spartans bio
New England Patriots bio
New York Jets bio

1979 births
Living people
Sportspeople from Queens, New York
Players of American football from New York City
African-American players of American football
Players of American football from Michigan
American football tight ends
Michigan State Spartans football players
New York Jets players
New England Patriots players
Seattle Seahawks players
People from Saline, Michigan
21st-century African-American sportspeople
20th-century African-American sportspeople
Ed Block Courage Award recipients